Marmore Mena Intelligence is a research firm based out of Chennai, India. It is a majority owned subsidiary of ‘Markaz’, an asset management and investment banking institution that is headquartered in Kuwait. Marmore specializes in research focused on financial markets, economic and sector studies, and policy analyses, with a primary focus on the Middle East and North African region (Mena). Markaz's Assets Under Management (AUM) as of 30 September 2018 is KD 1.06 Billion (US$3.51 Billion).  Marmore's business model revolves around both syndicated research as well as customized research.

Marmore's syndicated research is sector/industry specific and aids clients with information and analyses to facilitate informed strategic decisions.  The company also conducts specialized and customized research for clients who have specific requirements. Marmore's research offerings encompass a spectrum of periodicity, ranging from daily to yearly publications. The company's research capabilities and product lines are represented with the following schema by the firm: 

Marmore's research offerings contain three broad streams. The following schema illustrates the broad framework of research publications from Marmore.

Marmore's published research essentially works under seven research pillars:

Infrastructure research
Over the past decades, the GCC has remained a highly lucrative market for infrastructure investments and build-up aided by demographic growth as well as oil income. Marmore's infrastructure research attempts to provide intelligence and analysis on various developments in the sector to support investment strategies. The various infrastructure streams covered include power, water, ports, ICT, aviation, roads and railways, and real estate. Marmore’s infrastructure research generally focuses on lighting infrastructure bottlenecks and areas requiring urgent investments in terms of providing a fillip to the host economies. An example is the firm's report on GCC Seaports, in which key areas requiring investments were highlighted. Apart from GCC oriented reports, Marmore provides country specific reports which can be useful for investors looking for research on a particular sector in a country. For e.g., Marmore's report on Kuwait Water helped highlight the fact that the total investment in Kuwait's water sector between 2005 and 2014 stood at $5.28 billion.

Sector research
Marmore's sector reports focus on strategically important sectors in terms of the Mena region. These reports analyse multiple sectors for a plethora of investment opportunities, market analysis, general economic research and for policy making activities. Marmore’s sector reports cover niche areas that, nevertheless, are of value in terms of strategic investments. Examples of sectors covered include the banking, Retail, wealth management, offsets, etc. Marmore's sector research provides an overview for the busy investor, while those pursuing deeper market information can peruse the reports for deeper insights and extensive analyses. An example of sector research from Marmore is the GCC Banking report. Marmore's GCC Healthcare report sized the growing market and provided a round-up on the key projects across the GCC.

Economic research
The economic research series from Marmore analyses a number of topical economic themes of the day in terms of the economic currents shaping developments. Marmore's Economic Research encompasses thematic qualitative researches that can encourage informed discussion and further knowledge generation. They usually follow the format of strategic research notes and provide the key breakout thinking on a topic. Topical themes are picked up for discussion and analysis, and for quantification (wherever possible). For e.g., Marmore's 2015 economic research on the roll back of fuel subsidies in Kuwait estimated that the "fuel price increases may escalate costs facing the Kuwaiti construction industry by about 1% of GDP,"  Marmore's report on the fiscal breakeven oil price flagged the large differences in estimation that can stem from whether investment income are included or excluded in calculations .

Capital market research
Through its capital market reports series, Marmore attempts to provide perspectives to investors and other interested stakeholders regarding Mena capital markets. Marmore's capital market reports are comprehensive in nature in terms of covering the breadth of issues and data that informed investors need in terms of understanding dynamic capital markets of the region. The reports also provide an analysis of historical trends and future projections. Examples include GCC M&A Report—2014, MENA Asset Management Policy Perspectives, etc. A specific example includes the GCC asset management industry study, which provides a deep dive into the asset management industry across the GCC in terms of assets under management (AUM), number and types of funds managed, top managers across the various markets, fund costs, etc.

Periodic research

The periodic reports from Marmore cover a range of research requirements, including snapshots of everyday capital market performance to annual publications that summarize the key economic and regulatory trends affecting a country in the Mena region or the region itself, as a whole. In essence, the periodic reports provide regular information on the regional capital markets, economic issues or events shaping developments and the trends that may impact future outlook.

Marmore releases periodic publications on a daily, monthly, quarterly and semi-annual basis. The periodic publications cover a range of research requirements. For instance, the daily publications cover everyday developments in the stock markets that are essential knowledge for serious investors (e.g., Daily Morning Brief). On the other end of the scale, the semi-annual publications (like the GCC Market Outlook series) integrate and analyze developments over a time period to synthesize research insights and knowledge.

References

Market research companies of Kuwait